Kelli Hollis (born 29 June 1976) is a British actress, known for playing Tina Crabtree in the three Channel 4 related films, shop owner Yvonne Karib in Channel 4's popular comedy-drama Shameless and Melanie Say then as Ali Spencer in ITV's long-running soap opera Emmerdale.
Hollis now lives in Thailand with her partner, where they run  a cafe bar.

Career
Hollis played Melanie Say in Emmerdale in 2002, portraying Yvonne Karib in Shameless for six years, starting in 2004. She also played the character of Tina Crabtree in two television dramas, Tina Goes Shopping (1999), Tina Takes a Break (2001) as well as Mischief Night (2006) which was a cinema-released feature film, all three were directed by Penny Woolcock. Hollis has also portrayed Maggie Simms in the 5Star prison drama Clink, as well as Loan Shark Linda in the Channel 4 Drama Ackley Bridge. Additionally, Hollis appeared in two episodes of the television series Dalziel and Pascoe, as the character Bridget Croft. She also appeared in BBC1 drama Waterloo Road, as Chantel and as Anne West in the TV film See No Evil about the Moors Murders.  She also appeared in the female football drama Playing the Field. In May 2020, she appeared in an episode of the BBC soap opera Doctors as Rachel Edwards.

References

External links
 

Living people
1976 births
Actresses from Leeds
English television actresses
English soap opera actresses